Anett Timea Györe (born 10 December 1981 in Budapest) is a female water polo player from Hungary, who competed for her native country at the 2004 Summer Olympics in Athens, Greece. There she finished in sixth place with the Hungary women's national team. A year earlier she was on the side that claimed the silver medal at the European Championship in Ljubljana, Slovenia.

References
  Profile

External links
 

1981 births
Living people
Hungarian female water polo players
Olympic water polo players of Hungary
Water polo players at the 2004 Summer Olympics
Water polo players at the 2008 Summer Olympics
Water polo players from Budapest
Universiade medalists in water polo
Universiade silver medalists for Hungary
Medalists at the 2009 Summer Universiade
20th-century Hungarian women
21st-century Hungarian women